Pogledets Island is the northernmost of Dunbar Islands off Varna Peninsula, Livingston Island in the South Shetland Islands.  The feature is ice-free, crescent shaped facing southwest, and extending 200 m in north-south direction and 170 m in east-west direction.  The area was visited by early 19th century sealers.

The island is named after Pogledets Peak in Rila Mountain and its namesake in Stara Planina, Bulgaria.

Location

Pogledets Island is located 860 m northeast of Zavala Island, 450 m northwest of Aspis Island and 1.45 km southwest of Williams Point, Livingston Island.  British mapping in 1968 and Bulgarian mapping in 2009.

Maps
 Livingston Island to King George Island.  Scale 1:200000.  Admiralty Nautical Chart 1776.  Taunton: UK Hydrographic Office, 1968.
 L.L. Ivanov. Antarctica: Livingston Island and Greenwich, Robert, Snow and Smith Islands. Scale 1:120000 topographic map. Troyan: Manfred Wörner Foundation, 2009.  (Second edition 2010)
Antarctic Digital Database (ADD). Scale 1:250000 topographic map of Antarctica. Scientific Committee on Antarctic Research (SCAR). Since 1993, regularly upgraded and updated.

References
 Bulgarian Antarctic Gazetteer. Antarctic Place-names Commission. (details in Bulgarian, basic data in English)
 Pogledets Island. SCAR Composite Antarctic Gazetteer.

External links
 Pogledets Island. Copernix satellite image

Islands of the South Shetland Islands
Bulgaria and the Antarctic